William Henry Donaldson (born June 2, 1931) was the 27th Chairman of the U.S. Securities and Exchange Commission (SEC), serving from February 2003 to June 2005. He served as Under Secretary of State for International Security Affairs in the Nixon Administration, as a special adviser to Vice President Nelson Rockefeller, Chairman and CEO of the New York Stock Exchange, and Chairman, President and CEO of Aetna. Donaldson founded Donaldson, Lufkin & Jenrette.

Early life and education
Donaldson attended both Yale University (B.A. 1953) and Harvard University (M.B.A. 1958). While he was a senior at Yale, he joined its Skull and Bones secret society.

Career

He began his career at G. H. Walker & Co., a banking and brokerage firm.

Donaldson returned to Yale and founded the Yale School of Management, where he served as dean and professor of management studies. Donaldson had a vision of Yale's management program forming students who could easily and seamlessly flow between public and private management roles. This was a binary vision, emphasizing private for profit corporations and government leadership positions, while ignoring leadership in various not-for-profit, non-governmental organizations. 

His grand visions of balanced approaches were shattered when the first graduating class almost all took positions in business, almost none taking jobs with government. The main building of the school continues to display a life-size portrait of him and the premier leadership award at Yale School of Management is called "Donaldson Fellows". He also served in the United States Marine Corps.

He was Chairman of the Carnegie Endowment for International Peace from 1999 to 2003.

Donaldson is a chartered financial analyst (CFA) charterholder and has received a number of honorary degrees.

He is on the board of IEX.

Personal life
Donaldson is the father of three children and is married to Jane Phillips Donaldson.

References

External links

|-

|-

|-

1931 births
Living people
Members of the U.S. Securities and Exchange Commission
Politicians from Buffalo, New York
Harvard Business School alumni
Yale University alumni
United States Under Secretaries of State
CFA charterholders
New York (state) Republicans
American chief executives of financial services companies
United States Marines
Businesspeople from Buffalo, New York
20th-century American businesspeople
21st-century American businesspeople
Yale School of Management faculty
Nixon administration personnel
George W. Bush administration personnel
Carnegie Endowment for International Peace